Eugene Louis Dodaro (born May 7, 1951) is the Comptroller General of the United States and head of the U.S. Government Accountability Office (GAO). From October 1, 2000, until March 12, 2008, he was the chief operating officer (COO) of the GAO and he held the equivalent second-in-command title before the late 2000 restructuring of the GAO, Principal Assistant Comptroller General, a title he had held since May 1999. This change of titles is a result of the organization-wide restructuring rather than a promotion or other event in his career; from May 1999 through to March 12, 2008, Dodaro retained the position of second in command of the GAO.

Early life and education
Dodaro is the son of Jim and Betty Dodaro and grew up in the Monessen—Belle Vernon region of Pennsylvania, attending Belle Vernon Area High School, where he played basketball.

Dodaro attended Lycoming College in Williamsport, Pennsylvania and graduated in 1973 receiving a Bachelor of Arts degree in accounting.

Career 

Dodaro joined the GAO in 1973.  His first executive posting was as an associate director for management issues in the General Government Division. In 1993 he was named Assistant Comptroller General for Accounting and Information Management. In 1999 he became the GAO's second in command.

On February 15, 2008, when the seventh Comptroller General of the United States, David M. Walker, announced that he was departing from his office before the end of his 15-year term to work for The Peter G. Peterson Foundation, he appointed Dodaro to replace him. On March 13, 2008, Dodaro became the Acting Comptroller General and was nominated by President Obama. He was confirmed by the U.S. Senate for a term of fifteen years on December 22, 2010. He was sworn in eight days later.

Awards and honors 
In 1981 Dodaro received the GAO's Meritorious Service Award. In 1989 he received the Arthur S. Flemming Award for outstanding individual performance in government.  In 2001 he became a Fellow of the National Academy of Public Administration and in 2003 was awarded the prestigious National Public Service Award conferred by that organization.

Personal life 
Dodaro and his wife, Joan (née McCabe), have three children. They live in Alexandria, Virginia.

References

External links

Biography

1951 births
21st-century American politicians
American chief operating officers
Comptrollers General of the United States
Living people
Lycoming College alumni